Valentin Gnahoua (born September 29, 1994) is a French professional gridiron football defensive end for the Saskatchewan Roughriders of the Canadian Football League (CFL). He was the first overall pick by the Hamilton Tiger-Cats in the 2019 European CFL Draft.

Early years
Gnahoua began playing American football in 2011, joining a local semi-pro team, the Caimans du Mans, as a sixteen-year old. He was drawn to the sport after watching a National Football League game on television earlier that year.

In 2016, he arrived in Canada, playing one season of collegiate football for the McGill Redmen before a sudden increase in international student tuition forced him to return to France.

Professional career

Berlin Rebels
He rejoined the Caimans in 2017, playing well enough early on in the campaign to get signed by the Berlin Rebels of the German Football League (GFL) midway through the 2017 GFL season. He recorded 47 tackles and nine sacks during his two seasons with the Rebels.

Hamilton Tiger-Cats
In 2019, he was announced as one of the 18 European players invited to the 2019 CFL Combine in Toronto. The following month, in April, he was selected by the Hamilton Tiger-Cats as the first overall pick in the inaugural European CFL draft, part of commissioner Randy Ambrosie's initiative to grow the league's presence internationally. He began the season as a member of the practice squad, but made his debut during their week 9 matchup against the BC Lions on August 10, recovering an onside kick that led to a second-quarter field goal in the 35-34 victory.

Gnahoua signed a contract extension with the Tiger-Cats on December 29, 2020. He was placed on the suspended list on July 19, 2021, but was later activated and played in the first regular season game of 2021. He became a free agent upon the expiry of his contract on February 14, 2023.

Saskatchewan Roughriders
On February 17, 2023, it was announced that Gnahoua had signed with the Saskatchewan Roughriders.

Personal life
His father was a professional association football (soccer) player who was a member of the Ivory Coast national football team and played professionally in France, where Valentin was born.

References

External links
 Saskatchewan Roughriders bio
 McGill Redmen bio

Living people
1994 births
French players of American football
French players of Canadian football
French sportspeople of Ivorian descent
American football defensive linemen
Canadian football defensive linemen
McGill Redbirds football players
German Football League players
Hamilton Tiger-Cats players
French expatriate sportspeople in Canada
French expatriate sportspeople in Germany
Sportspeople from Le Mans
World Games gold medalists
Competitors at the 2017 World Games
Black French sportspeople
Saskatchewan Roughriders players